Joe Chan (born 10 March 2002) is a French professional rugby league footballer who plays as a  forward for the Melbourne Storm in the National Rugby League. 

He previously played for Catalans Dragons in the Super League and Saint-Esteve in the Elite One Championship.

Background
Chan is of Chinese-Māori heritage and is the son of former New Zealand international Alex Chan and brother of Tiaki Chan.

Career
In 2021 he made his Catalans debut in the Challenge Cup against the Warrington Wolves. On 22nd April 2022 he signed a two year contract to play for the Melbourne Storm for the 2023 and 2024 seasons.

References

External links
Catalans Dragons profile

2002 births
Living people
AS Saint Estève players
Catalans Dragons players
French rugby league players
Rugby league second-rows